Uppsala International Short Film Festival is an annual festival hosted in Uppsala, Sweden since 1982. As of 2002 the winner of the award "Uppsala Grand Prix" and the winner of the Uppsala Film Jackdaw for Best Children's Film are eligible for an Academy Award nomination. The Uppsala International Short Film Festival, Sweden's premier arena for short film, shows more than 300 short films along with lectures and seminars that give an insight into Swedish film, culture and history. Swedish and international filmmakers and other professionals attend.

Award winners 
Uppsala Grand Prix is the main award of the festival.

References

External links 
Uppsala International Short Film Festival web page
Watch — Sweden's official film player – Swedish film streamed online; short film, documentaries, interviews
Film: Swedish film in focus – Fact sheet on Sweden.se, Sweden's official website, published by the Swedish Institute
Sweden.se film room – Films and features about Swedish film on Sweden.se, Sweden's official website

Film festivals in Sweden
Short film festivals
Culture in Uppsala
Film festivals established in 1982
1982 establishments in Sweden